A closed-circuit radio is a radio that emits over a very small range, typically a college campus. This system can be achieved from two ways:
By tying into the PA System
By using existing power lines, telephones lines, pipes, etc. to transmit a carrier current

References

Radio communications